Lithium perchlorate is the inorganic compound with the formula LiClO4. This white or colourless crystalline salt is noteworthy for its high solubility in many solvents.  It exists both in anhydrous form and as a trihydrate.

Applications

Inorganic chemistry
Lithium perchlorate is used as a source of oxygen in some chemical oxygen generators. It decomposes at about 400 °C, yielding lithium chloride and oxygen:
 LiClO4  →  LiCl  +  2 O2
Over 60% of the mass of the lithium perchlorate is released as oxygen. It has both the highest oxygen to weight and oxygen to volume ratio of all practical perchlorate salts.

Organic chemistry
LiClO4 is highly soluble in organic solvents, even diethyl ether.  Such solutions are employed in Diels–Alder reactions, where it is proposed that the Lewis acidic Li+ binds to Lewis basic sites on the dienophile, thereby accelerating the reaction.

Lithium perchlorate is also used as a co-catalyst in the coupling of α,β-unsaturated carbonyls with aldehydes, also known as the Baylis–Hillman reaction.

Solid lithium perchlorate is found to be a mild and efficient Lewis acid for promoting cyanosilylation of carbonyl compounds under neutral conditions.

Batteries
Lithium perchlorate is also used as an electrolyte salt in lithium-ion batteries. Lithium perchlorate is chosen over alternative salts such as lithium hexafluorophosphate or lithium tetrafluoroborate when its superior electrical impedance, conductivity, hygroscopicity, and anodic stability properties are of importance to the specific application. However, these beneficial properties are often overshadowed by the electrolyte's strong oxidizing properties, making the electrolyte reactive toward its solvent at high temperatures and/or high current loads.  Due to these hazards the battery is often considered unfit for industrial applications.

Biochemistry
Concentrated solutions of lithium perchlorate (4.5 mol/L) are used as a chaotropic agent to denature proteins.

Production
Lithium perchlorate can be manufactured by reaction of sodium perchlorate with lithium chloride. It can be also prepared by electrolysis of lithium chlorate at 200 mA/cm2 at temperatures above 20 °C.

Safety
Perchlorates often give explosive mixtures with organic compounds, finely divided metals, and other reducing agents.

References

External links
 WebBook page for LiClO4

Perchlorates
Lithium salts
Oxidizing agents
Electrolytes